The Gambling Act 2005 (2005 c 19) is an Act of the Parliament of the United Kingdom. It mainly applies to England and Wales, and to Scotland, and is designed to control all forms of gambling.  It transfers authority for licensing gambling from the magistrates' courts to local authorities (specifically unitary authorities, and the councils of metropolitan borough, non-metropolitan district and London boroughs), or to Scottish licensing boards. The Act also created the Gambling Commission.

Provisions 
The Act gives its objectives as

Some provisions of the bill faced controversy, particularly in its original form, where it would have allowed eight so-called "super casinos" to be set up.  With the Parliamentary session drawing to a close, a compromise was agreed to reduce this to one. Despite a lengthy bidding process, with Manchester being chosen as the single planned location, the development was cancelled soon after Gordon Brown became Prime Minister of the United Kingdom. The Act also specifically regulates Internet gambling for the first time.

The law permits gambling companies to advertise on television and radio.

The act is wide-ranging including regulation of lotteries.  The "no purchase necessary" clause on on-product promotions and semi-legal competitions went, replaced with the so-called "New Zealand Model" where purchase may be a requirement, if the purchase is at the "normal selling price".

The Act, together with regulations and specifications developed by the Gambling Commission, define and in some cases redefine, categories of gaming machines and where they are allowed to be placed.

2014 amendments 
From 1 December 2014, the Gambling (Licensing & Advertising) Act 2014 contributed several updates to the Act, including a requirement that all off-shore gambling brands apply for a licence from the Gambling Commission and submit to a 15% point of consumption (POC) tax on gross profits.

2021 review 
On 8 December 2020, the UK government announced a review of the act, to "make sure it is fit for the digital age". The announcement included a call for evidence, with a deadline at the end of March 2021.

See also
 Gaming Act 1845
 Gaming law
 Gambling in the United Kingdom

Notes

External links
The Gambling Act 2005, as amended from the National Archives
The Gambling Act 2005, as originally enacted from the National Archives
Explanatory notes to the Gambling Act 2005
Department of Culture note on the Act

United Kingdom Acts of Parliament 2005
Gambling legislation in the United Kingdom